Rajolu, Rajavolu, Razole may refer to:

Razole, East Godavari district, a village in East Godavari district, Andhra Pradesh
Rajavolu, Guntur district, a village in Guntur district, Andhra Pradesh, India
Rajavolu, East Godavari District, A village in the East Godavari District, Andhra Pradesh, India. Now it is a part of Rajamendravaram Rural.